WCHI (1350 AM) is a radio station broadcasting a soft adult contemporary format. Licensed to Chillicothe, Ohio, United States.  The station is currently owned by iHeartMedia, Inc.

History
The call letters WCHI originally belonged to a radio station in the Chicago, Illinois, area. On October 30, 1931, that station was ordered to go off the air.

On November 12, 2012 WCHI changed their format from oldies to comedy.

On June 4, 2014 WCHI changed their format to soft adult contemporary, branded as "EZ 1350".

Previous logo

References

External links

CHI
Radio stations established in 1951
Soft adult contemporary radio stations in the United States
1951 establishments in Ohio
IHeartMedia radio stations